Flaçà is a town in the Gironès county of Girona Province, Catalonia, Spain. It occupies an area of 6.67 square kilometers and extends the hills of the Lloreda Valley and alluvial plain of the Ter river. It borders the Ter River to the north and the municipality of Sant Jordi Desvalls to the west with the municipalities of Sant Joan de Mollet Sant Marti Vell to the south and to east, the towns of Foixà and la Pera.  The current population is 1,070 people.

It was formerly also on the  gauge Palamós–Girona–Banyoles railway, which opened to Palamós by 1887 and was extended to Girona by 1921. Service on the line continued until 1956.

References

External links
 Government data pages 

Municipalities in Gironès
Towns in Spain